5D Chess with Multiverse Time Travel is a 2020 chess variant video game released for Microsoft Windows, macOS, and Linux by American studio Thunkspace.

The game was praised by critics for its complex and elegant design.

Gameplay
The general gameplay of 5D Chess with Multiverse Time Travel starts off similarly to a standard game of chess. As the game progresses, the game becomes increasingly complex through a series of alternate timelines that the player can take advantage of. The game can be played online against other players or offline against an AI.

Rules 
A standard game of 5D Chess begins with an ordinary chess setup, starting on White's turn.

Along with the x- and y-axes, the game introduces two additional axes of movement: the turn axis, displayed horizontally, and the timeline axis, displayed vertically. In this display, up and down are in opposite directions for each player, but left and right are the same. A distance of one space corresponds to a distance of one square horizontally, one square vertically, one turn, or one timeline. Each player takes their turn by making a move or series of moves and then pressing the "Submit Moves" button.

A player may make a move only on a board where it is their turn. A move is considered to be made on a board if the piece making the move begins and/or ends its move on that board. If a player makes a move on a board, then the resulting position is created as a new board, one half-turn to the right; the original board itself remains unchanged. The new board is on the opponent's turn. A board is outlined in the color of the player whose turn it is on that board.

A timeline consists of a series of boards in the same horizontal row. If a board is the latest board on its timeline, then the board is considered to be playable, indicated by a thick outline; otherwise, it is considered to be unplayable, indicated by a thin outline. A player may make a move only using a piece that stands on a playable board. If a piece's move ends on a playable board, then the resulting new board is created on the same timeline.

A piece may travel through time using its movement abilities. If a player makes a move such that a piece travels to an unplayable board, then a new timeline is created in the direction of the player, downward from that player's perspective, in the vacant row closest to the originating timeline; the resulting new board is placed on the new timeline. A piece may move between timelines. Traveling between boards considers only boards outlined in the player's color; boards outlined in the opponent's color are ignored.

All pieces retain their movement abilities from standard chess. In addition, their movement abilities are generalized across the turn and timeline axes. The moves of the pieces are as follows:

 The rook may move any distance along exactly one axis.
 The bishop may move any distance along exactly two axes equally.
 The queen may move any distance along any number of axes equally.

When moving, the rook, bishop, and queen must travel through a continuous series of unobstructed squares.

 The king may move one space along any number of axes. Castling is not generalized across turns and timelines.
 The knight may move in a pattern of two spaces along one axis and then one space along another axis. It is not required to travel along unobstructed squares when moving; it may "jump" past obstacles in the way, including missing boards.
 The pawn may move one space to a vacant square along one axis towards the opponent's side. Moving towards the opponent's side is considered to be in the upward direction, along the y-axis or the timeline axis. On the pawn's first move, it may move two spaces through two vacant squares along one axis towards the opponent's side. The pawn may capture onto an opponent's piece one space towards the opponent's side along either of the following sets of axes: the x- and y-axes, or the turn and timeline axes. When a pawn reaches its last rank, it is promoted to a queen; it cannot be promoted to any other piece. The en passant capture is not generalized across turns and timelines.

A timeline created by a player is considered to be that player's timeline. If a player, while their number of timelines is at least one greater than the opponent's number of timelines, creates a timeline, then that new timeline is considered to be inactive; if a timeline is not inactive, then it is considered to be active. If a player, while the opponent has at least one inactive timeline, creates a timeline, then the opponent's oldest inactive timeline becomes active. An active board is a playable board on an active timeline.

The present line is a large vertical bar that touches the active board which is the furthest left along the turn axis. The present line also touches every board in the same column as that board. Every board touched by the present line is considered to be in the present. On a player's turn, they must make moves until the present line shifts to being on their opponent's turn. The player may also optionally make moves on any playable board where it is their turn. The player may undo any moves made during their turn prior to the end of that turn. The player's moves are finalized and the turn is complete when the player submits their moves.

A player is in check in a situation where it is the player's turn and, if the player were to pass their move on all active boards in the present, then the opponent would be able to capture one of the player's kings. A player cannot make a move that would allow one of their kings to be captured.

If the player whose turn it is has no way to legally complete their turn, then the game ends in one of two ways:

 If the player is in check, then they are in checkmate, and they lose.
 Otherwise, the game ends in a stalemate, resulting in a draw.

Variants 
5D Chess has many variant modes. These can alter factors such as the starting position, the board size (4×4, 5×5, 6×6, 7×7, and 8×8 are possible), the number of starting timelines, and so on. The game also has several fairy pieces, which move as follows:

 The princess may move any distance along up to two axes equally.
 The unicorn may move any distance along exactly three axes equally.
 The dragon may move any distance along exactly four axes equally.

When moving, the princess, unicorn, and dragon must travel through a continuous series of unobstructed squares.

 The brawn has the movement and promotion abilities of the pawn. In addition, the brawn may capture one space towards the opponent's side along any combination of a horizontal axis and a vertical axis.
 The mann may move one space along any number of axes. (It is akin to a king with no royal powers.)

The game features a puzzle mode.

Release
The game was launched on 22 July 2020 on Steam. It was developed by Conor Petersen and Thunkspace. Petersen said that he had enjoyed chess variants such as three-dimensional chess and conceived of using time as an additional dimension for piece movements. He said: "From there, I tried to solve each problem or paradox I found."

Reception
5D Chess with Multiverse Time Travel received highly positive reviews. Kotaku reviewer Nathan Grayson called the game "remarkably elegant for what it is". Arne Kaehler, of ChessBase, noted that while the game ran well and is a fun chess variant, the opponent AI was not very competent. A Digitally Downloaded reviewer noted that, due to the increasing complexity of the game as turns pass, it presents a "limitless well of possibility". Christopher Livingston of PC Gamer called the game "mind-bending". Jacob Aron of New Scientist wrote that the game "isn't for the faint-hearted" and "is brain-meltingly hard".

Grandmaster Hikaru Nakamura played the game when appearing on VENN in August 2020.

See also

List of four-dimensional games

References

External links 
 

Chess variants
Video games developed in the United States
Windows games
Windows-only games
2020 video games
Multiplayer and single-player video games
Chess software